Meiggs may refer to:

Henry Meiggs (1811-1877), American promoter/entrepreneur and railroad builder
Russell Meiggs (1902-1989), British ancient historian
Meiggs Wharf, former wooden pier in San Francisco, California, United States

See also
Meigs (disambiguation)